Hilinski is a Slavic surname. Notable people with the surname include:

 Ryan Hilinski (born 2000), American football player
 Tyler Hilinski (1996–2018), American football player

Surnames of Slavic origin